Something Shines is the third studio album from the French singer Lætitia Sadier, was released on 23 September, 2014, under Drag City records.

Track listing

Personnel
Credits adapted from liner notes.

 Lætitia Sadier - voice, guitar, bass pedals, choir, mixing
 Michael Andrews - 80's electric guitar
 Gabriele Blandini - trumpet
 Matthieu Beck - choir
 Jean-Christophe Chante - strings, trumpet
 Ubaldo Chirizzi - cello
 Macke Depret - guitars 
 Mia Depret-Pioline - vocals
 Massimiliano Giannuzzi - bass, electric guitar
 Alfonso Girardo - violin
 Atomic Jetman - vocals, sleeve
 Arianna Latarta - viola
 Mason Le Long - guitar , guitar lead 
 Stefano Manca - recording and mixing 
 Giuseppe Magagnino - piano, wurlitzer, string and horns arrangement 
 Emma Mario - percussion, drums, electronics, vocals, production, mixing
 Giuseppe Manta - acoustic guitar
 Marie Merlet - choir
 Jose Missionario  - bass 
 Chiquinho Moreira - electronics , keys , effects 
 Xavi Munoz - bass, vocals, choir
 Armelle Pioline - vocals, keyboards 
 Matilde De Rubertis - chorus
 David Thayer - vocals, organs, electronics, vibraphone, flute, Garken SX150, photography
 Giulia Tedesco - chorus
 Giorgio Tuma - crumar synth, chorus, string and horn arrangements 
 Marco Tuma - flute
 Antonio Valsano - congas

References

External links
 

2014 albums
Drag City (record label) albums